Double or Nothing is a 1936 American short musical comedy film directed by Joseph Henabery. It was nominated for an Academy Award at the 9th Academy Awards in 1936 for Best Short Subject (Two-Reel). The Academy Film Archive preserved Double or Nothing in 2013.

Cast
 Phil Harris
 Leah Ray
 Harry Tyler
 Vicki Joyce
 Johnny Boyle

References

External links

1936 films
1936 musical comedy films
1936 short films
American black-and-white films
Films directed by Joseph Henabery
American musical comedy films
Films produced by Samuel Sax
Warner Bros. short films
1930s English-language films
1930s American films